The "Persian style" (New Persian:شیوه معماری پارسی) is a style of architecture ("sabk") defined by Mohammad Karim Pirnia when categorizing the history of Persian/Iranian architectural development. Although the Median and Achaemenid architecture fall under this classification, the pre-Achaemenid architecture is also studied as a sub-class of this category.

This style of architecture flourished from eighth century BCE from the time of the Median Empire, through the Achaemenid empire, to the arrival of Alexander III of Macedonia in the third century BCE

Gallery of samples

See also
Iranian architecture

References

Architecture in Iran
Medes
Achaemenid architecture